This is a list of the electric utilities in Canada.

List of electric utilities by size

List of electric utilities by province or territory 
This is a list of Canadian public and private electric utilities, by province.

Electric Transmission:
AltaLink

Investor Owned:
FortisAlberta
ATCO Electric

Municipals:
City of Lethbridge Electric Utility
ENMAX (formerly City of Calgary Electric System)
EPCOR (formerly Edmonton Power Corporation)
City of Medicine Hat Electric Utility
Town of Ponoka
City of Red Deer Electric Light and Power
Town of Cardston

Rural Electrification Associations:
Battle River Power Cooperative
Beaver REA
Blue Mountain Power Corp.
Borradaile REA
Braes REA
Claysmore REA
Devonia REA
Drayton Valley REA
Duffield REA
EQUS
Ermineskin REA
Fenn REA
Heart River REA
Kneehill REA
Lindale REA
MaKenzie REA
Mayerthorpe and District REA
Niton REA
North Parkland Power
Sterling REA
Stony Plain REA
Tomahawk REA
West Liberty REA
Willingdon REA

Sold to FortisAlberta:
Town of Fort Macleod
Municipality of Crowsnest Pass

TransAlta Corporation
 Direct Energy

BC Hydro
Columbia Power Corporation
FortisBC

Municipals:
Grand Forks Hydro
Nelson Hydro
New Westminster
Penticton
Summerland

Manitoba Hydro

NB Power
Saint John Energy

Municipals:
Town of Perth Andover
Energie Edmunston Energy

Newfoundland and Labrador Hydro
Churchill Falls (Labrador) Corporation Limited
Lower Churchill Development Corporation Limited
Newfoundland Power

Northland Utilities 
Northwest Territories Power Corporation

Nova Scotia Power
Antigonish Electric Utility
Berwick Electric Light Commission
Canso Electric Light Commission
Lunenburg Electric Utility
Mahone Bay Electric Utility
Riverport Electric Light Commission

Qulliq Energy Corporation

Ontario’s electricity distribution consists of multiple local distribution companies (LDCs). Hydro One, a publicly-traded company owned in part by the provincial government, is the largest LDC in the province and services approximately 26 percent of all electricity customers in Ontario.

The other local distribution companies in Ontario may be municipally owned corporations or privately-operated entities, and include:
 Alectra Utilities, serving: Aurora, Alliston, Barrie, Beeton, Bradford West Gwillimbury, Brampton, Guelph, Hamilton, Markham, Mississauga, Penetanguishene, Richmond Hill, Rockwood, St. Catharines, Thornton, Tottenham, and Vaughan
 Algoma Power, serving: Algoma
 Canadian Niagara Power, serving: Fort Erie and Port Colborne
 Cornwall Electric, serving : Cornwall, South Glengarry, South Stormont, Akwesasne
 Elexicon Energy, serving: Ajax, Pickering, Whitby, Belleville, Bowmanville, Gravenhurst, Uxbridge and Scugog 
 Energy+, serving: Cambridge, North Dumfries, and Brant
 Enova Power, serving: Kitchener, Waterloo, Woolwich, Wilmot, and Wellesley
 EPCOR Utilities, serving: Collingwood, Stayner, Creemore, and Thornbury
 Festival Hydro, serving: Stratford, St. Mary's, Seaforth, Hensall, Brussels, Zurich and Dashwood
 Greater Sudbury Hydro, serving: Sudbury and West Nipissing
 Hydro Ottawa, serving: Ottawa and Casselman
 London Hydro
 Oakville Hydro
 Synergy North, serving: Kenora and Thunder Bay
 Toronto Hydro

Maritime Electric
Summerside Electric

Boralex
 Cartier Wind Energy
 Hydro-Jonquière
 Hydro Magog
 Hydro-Québec
 Hydro-Sherbrooke
 Hydro Westmount
 Innergex Renewable Energy
 Rio Tinto Alcan

SaskPower
Saskatoon Light & Power
Swift Current Light and Power

ATCO Electric Yukon
Yukon Energy Corporation

See also 
 Electricity sector in Canada
 List of Canadian mobile phone companies
 List of Canadian telephone companies
 List of telephone operating companies
 List of public utilities
 ISO New England
 List of United States electric companies
 Electricity distribution companies by country

Notes

References 

Lists of companies by country and industry
 
Electric utilities
Lists of energy companies
Electric power-related lists